We Two may refer to:
 "We two," a personal pronoun in certain languages (See "we".)
 We two, ours one, a population planning term.
 Vi två, a 1939 Swedish film directed by Schamyl Bauman.
 We Two Alone, a 1952 Italian comedy film.
 "We Two," a 1983 song by the Little River Band, released in The Net album.
 We Two Are One Too, a 1990 music compilation video released by the British pop group Eurythmics.
 We Two Kings, a 2002 episode of tenth season of Frasier.